Belodontichthys is a genus of sheatfishes native to Asia.

Species
There are currently two recognized species in this genus:
 Belodontichthys dinema (Bleeker, 1851)
 Belodontichthys truncatus Kottelat & Ng, 1999

B. dinema originates from Laos, Vietnam, Thailand, Malay Peninsula, Sumatra, and Borneo. This species grows up to about 100.0 centimetres (39.4 in) TL. M. dinema occurs in medium to large-sized rivers and is found from middle depths to the surface in deeper parts of large rivers. This species feeds on smaller fish near the water surface. It is an excellent game fish which can be caught using hook and line. Presently, large numbers are being taken near Stung Treng in Cambodia by explosives. It is marketed fresh or dried and salted.

B. truncatus is known from the Mekong and Chao Phraya River basins. This species grows up to 60.0 cm (23.6 in) SL. B. truncatus migrates upstream through the Khone Falls in June to July with other silurids and enters the flooded forest in July to October, where it feeds heavily on cyprinids of the genus Henicorhynchus.

References

External links

Mekong Fisheries of Thailand

Siluridae
Fish of Asia
Fish of the Mekong Basin
Fish of Cambodia
Fish of Indonesia
Fish of Laos
Fish of Malaysia
Fish of Thailand
Fish of Vietnam
Freshwater fish genera
Catfish genera
Taxa named by Pieter Bleeker